Edward Cope may refer to:

 Edward Drinker Cope (1840–1897), American paleontologist and comparative anatomist
 Edward Meredith Cope (1818–1873), English classical scholar